Darisa is a genus of moths in the family Geometridae described by Frederic Moore in 1888.

Species
Darisa mucidaria (Walker, 1866) northern India, Thailand
Darisa maxima Moore, 1888 Thailand
Darisa parallela (Prout, 1927) Myanmar, Thailand
Darisa peracuta Sato, 1995 Thailand
Darisa missionaria (Wehrli, 1941) Thailand
Darisa firmilinea (Prout, 1926) Assam, Nepal
Darisa lampasaria (Hampson, 1895) Thailand

References

Boarmiini